The ir. D.F. Wouda Steam Pumping Station is a pumping station in the Netherlands, and the largest still operational steam-powered pumping station in the world. On October 7, 1920 Queen Wilhelmina opened the pumping station. It was built to pump excess water out of Friesland, a province in the north of the Netherlands. In 1967 the 47 years old coal furnaces were converted to run on heavy fuel oil. The pumping station is currently used to supplement the existing pumping capacity of the J.L. Hooglandgemaal in Stavoren in case of exceptionally high water levels in Friesland, which usually happens a few times each year.

-4 tandem compound, reciprocating steam engines, with poppet valves:

Single acting high pressure cylinder, 0.5 m diameter.
Double acting low pressure cylinder, uni-flow exhaust, 0.85 m diameter.
Stroke: 1.0 m
500 Horsepower, 373 kilowatt

-8 horizontal, double suction, fabricated, centrifugal pumps: 500 m³ per minute, 125,000 GPM, 180 MGD:

rotational speed: 95 to 115 rpm, impeller diameter 1.70 m.

Since 1998 the ir. D.F. Woudagemaal has been listed on the UNESCO World Heritage Site list.

The station is open for visitors and tours are given regularly.

Location 
The pumping station is located at Tacozijl just outside Lemmer

External links 

Official website
Visit site in 360° panophotography

World Heritage Sites in the Netherlands
Water supply pumping stations
Buildings and structures in Friesland